Green End may refer to many villages in the United Kingdom:

Green End, Bedfordshire
Green End, Buckinghamshire
Green End, Cambridgeshire
Green End, Hertfordshire
Green End, Lancashire
Green End, North Yorkshire

See also
Greenend, an area of Coatbridge, Scotland
Green's End, Rhode Island, USA